Carl B. Austing (April 25, 1910 – March 25, 1992) was an American professional basketball player who spent one season in the National Basketball League as a member of the Cincinnati Comellos. He played in five games during the 1937–38 season.

Prior to the NBL, Austing played for the University of Cincinnati.

References

1910 births
1992 deaths
Amateur Athletic Union men's basketball players
Basketball players from Ohio
Cincinnati Bearcats men's basketball players
Cincinnati Comellos players
American men's basketball players
Centers (basketball)
Forwards (basketball)